Jan van den Eynde or Vandeneynden (late 16th century or early 17th century – 1674) was a prominent Netherlandish merchant, banker, art collector, and patron of the arts. He was brother to Flemish merchant, art collector and art dealer Ferdinand van den Eynde, and father of the latter's namesake Ferdinand van den Eynde, Marquess of Castelnuovo. Van den Eynde's granddaughters were Elisabeth van den Eynde, Princess of Belvedere and Baroness of Gallicchio and Missanello, and Jane (Giovanna) van den Eynde, Princess of Galatro and Sonnino.

Early life and family

Van den Eynde was born in Antwerp, Spanish Netherlands, into a wealthy family of merchants, artists and art dealers possibly tied to the local nobility. The Van den Eynde were related to several notable Netherlandish artists, including Brueghel, Jode, and Lucas and Cornelis de Wael. Lucas and Cornelis de Wael were Ferdinand van den Eynde's nephews.

Move to Italy

In the early seventeenth century, at least two Van den Eyndes moved to Italy. Jan and his brother Ferdinand departed from Flanders either together or at different times. Ferdinand reportedly was active in Venice since as early as the second decade of the 17th century. He later resettled in Genoa, ca. 1619, before moving to Southern Italy.

Jan, on the other hand, first appears in Naples, as he did not follow his brother, neither in Venice nor in Genoa.

Between 1633 and 1640, a remarkable epitaph to Jan's brother Ferdinand was completed in Rome by François Duquesnoy. The putti included in this funerary monument are considered one of Duquesnoy's greatest achievements. Both Giovanni Battista Passeri and Giovanni Pietro Bellori stressed the fame of the Van den Eynde's putti, which served as models of the infant putto for contemporary artists. Other notable artists praised the Van den Eynde's putti. Among them are Johann Joachim Winckelmann (generally a harsh critic of Baroque sculpture) and Peter Paul Rubens, who requested a copy of them and commented "I do not know how [...] can I praise their beauty properly. It is nature, rather than art, that has formed them; the marble is softened into living flesh."

Ferdinand died prematurely in Rome in 1630, and was buried in Santa Maria dell'Anima. His nephew Cornelis de Wael was buried next to him. Two days before his death, Ferdinand made his will, bequeathing his art collection to his brother Jan.

In Naples, Jan established himself as a dealer in grain, silk, diamonds, and lace at first. Later, Van den Eynde also became a successful banker. In 1636, Van den Eynde entered a partnership with Gaspar Roomer, whose company dealt in luxury goods, lace, silk, grain, diamonds and ship insurance. When Van den Eynde became Roomer's partner and co-owner of his company, there was a substantial increase in the company's volume of business, particularly in brokering operations and silk trading.

Jan van den Eynde became exceedingly rich. This allowed him, among other things, to buy his son Ferdinand a peerage title. He purchased the monumental Palazzo Zevallos Stigliano (in central Naples), which was acquired by him in 1653. Van den Eynde filled the palace with a colossal collection of paintings, by artist such as Leonard Bramer, Giacinto Brandi, Jan van Boeckhorst, Jan Brueghel the Elder, Paul Bril, Viviano Codazzi, Aniello Falcone, Guercino, David de Haen, Pieter van Laer, Jan Miel, Cornelius van Poelenburch, Cornelis Schut, Goffredo Wals, Bartolomeo Passante, Mattia Preti, Pieter Paul Rubens, Carlo Saraceni, Massimo Stanzione, Van Dyck, Simon Vouet, Pieter de Witte and many others. Throughout the Baroque period, the Van den Eynde's was the largest collection of paintings in Naples and the Napoletano. It included the finest artwork of Italian and Flemish painters. The Van den Eynde's collections influenced other art collectors of the day, and had a fundamental influence on the following generation of local painters. Jan van den Eynde did not only become one of the richest men in Naples, but also one of the most prominent figures in the Italian city, developing strong ties with the Italian nobility and a close relationship with the viceroys. The Neapolitan citizens called him Vandìn.

Last years and progeny

Jan van den Eynde made his will in 1671. He died in Naples in 1674, the same year in which his son Ferdinand passed away.

Ferdinand, Marquess of Castelnuovo, was Jan van den Eynde's designated heir. However, in 1671 Van den Eynde ordered several legati. He left an yearly 10 000 ducats' revenue off some of his landed estate to his young grandson, Don Giovanni Mastrillo-van den Eynde, 3rd Marquess of Gallo (later 5th Duke of Marigliano), the son of his daughter Catherine van den Eynde, provided that he add Van den Eynde to his surname (item lascio jure legati a D. Giovanni Mastrillo Marchese del Gallo mio carissimo nipote docati 10 mila di capitale con sue annue entrate, cioè docati 5000 sopra la gabella del carlino a staro d'oglio, che da me si possiede, e gli altri docati 5000 sopra la grana 25 ad oncia con li loro frutti, con condizione, che appresso il suo Cognome si debba mettere il mio di Vandeneynden) and the right to 10 000 ducats' worth of income is never sold, lent out, or pledged.

Van den Eynde ordered an identical legato for the future firstborn of his other daughter, Donna Giovanna Maria van den Eynde (mother of Giuseppe di Gennaro Vandeneynden, 1st Prince of Sirignano) and Don Filippo di Gennaro, with the same conditions: that the family name Van den Eynde be appended and the bequest neither sold nor given away. Both marriages produced offspring, and both heirs added Van den Eynde to their name.

Van den Eynde's son Ferdinand (for whom, as mentioned, he purchased a peerage title) married Olimpia Piccolomini, nephew of Cardinal Celio Piccolomini. He restored the Van den Eynde's Palazzo Zevallos Stigliano, widened its art collection, and built the Villa Carafa of Belvedere in Vomero. Ferdinand had two daughters, Elisabeth and Jane, who married the heirs of two of the most powerful Italian families, the Colonna and the Carafa. Both marriages produced offspring.

Notes

References

Flemish merchants
Flemish art dealers
Italian art collectors
Italian patrons of the arts
17th-century Italian businesspeople
1674 deaths